Cane River is a river formed from a portion of the Red River that is located in Natchitoches Parish, Louisiana, United States.

Cane River may also refer to:

Rivers
 Cane River (Jamaica)
 Cane River (North Carolina), United States
 Cane River (Western Australia), in the Pilbara region

Other uses
 Cane River, North Carolina, an unincorporated community in Yancey County
 Cane River (novel), a 2001 historical novel by Lalita Tademy
 Cane River (film), a 1982 film by Horace B. Jenkins

See also
 Cane (disambiguation)
 Cane River Lake, a lake formed from a portion of the Red River in Natchitoches Parish, Louisiana
 Cane Creek (disambiguation)